Scott Davis and Jacco Eltingh were the defending champions, but Eltingh did not compete this year. Davis teamed up with David Pate and lost in the first round to Brian Devening and Jaime Oncins.

Rick Leach and Jared Palmer won the title by defeating Byron Black and Jonathan Stark 4–6, 6–4, 6–4 in the final.

Seeds

Draw

Draw

References

External links
 Official results archive (ATP)
 Official results archive (ITF)

San Jose Open - Doubles